The 1892 St. Louis Browns season was the team's 11th season in St. Louis, Missouri, and their first as members of the National League. In a split season schedule, the Browns finished ninth in the first half of the season and 11th in the second half. Overall, the team had a record of 56–94, 11th-best in the 12-team National League, better only than the Baltimore Orioles.

The Browns joined the National League when the American Association folded after the 1891 season and have remained a member ever since; the team has been known as the St. Louis Cardinals since 1900.  This was the Browns final season before moving from the original Sportsman's Park to New Sportsman's Park, where they would remain until 1920 when they would return to the original Sportsman's Park.

Regular season

Season standings

Record vs. opponents

Roster

Player stats

Batting

Starters by position 
Note: Pos = Position; G = Games played; AB = At bats; H = Hits; Avg. = Batting average; HR = Home runs; RBI = Runs batted in

Other batters 
Note: G = Games played; AB = At bats; H = Hits; Avg. = Batting average; HR = Home runs; RBI = Runs batted in

Pitching

Starting pitchers 
Note: G = Games pitched; IP = Innings pitched; W = Wins; L = Losses; ERA = Earned run average; SO = Strikeouts

Other pitchers 
Note: G = Games pitched; IP = Innings pitched; W = Wins; L = Losses; ERA = Earned run average; SO = Strikeouts

Relief pitchers 
Note: G = Games pitched; W = Wins; L = Losses; SV = Saves; ERA = Earned run average; SO = Strikeouts

References

External links 
1892 St. Louis Browns at Baseball-Reference.com
1892 St. Louis Browns at Baseball Almanac

St. Louis Cardinals seasons
Saint Louis Browns season
St Louis